Simoya Kadine Campbell (born 1 March 1994) is a Jamaican middle-distance runner competing primarily in the 800 metres. She won the silver medal at the 2015 Summer Universiade.

Her personal best in the event is 1:59.26 set in Gwangju in 2015.

Competition record

Personal bests
Outdoor
400 metres – 53.22 (Kingston 2015)
800 metres – 1:59.26 (Gwangju 2015)
1500 metres – 4:34.69 (Kingston 2012)
3000 metres – 10:42.08 (Kingston 2015)

References

1994 births
Living people
Jamaican female middle-distance runners
Commonwealth Games competitors for Jamaica
Athletes (track and field) at the 2014 Commonwealth Games
World Athletics Championships athletes for Jamaica
Athletes (track and field) at the 2016 Summer Olympics
Olympic athletes of Jamaica
Medalists at the 2015 Summer Universiade
Universiade medalists in athletics (track and field)
Universiade silver medalists for Jamaica